Yu Jing (born 29 May 1985) is a Chinese long-track speed-skater who specializes in the sprint distances. She became the World Sprint Champion in 2012, setting world records in both the sprint combination and the 500 metres. She held the world record in the sprint combination until Heather Richardson bettered it in January 2013, and the world record in 500 metres until Lee Sang-hwa broke it in November 2013. The time, 36.94 seconds, was the Chinese record until broken by Wang Beixing in November 2013.

Career

Yu Jing made her World Cup debut at the Changchun meeting in 2008, after winning a gold and a bronze at the Asian Championships the year before. Already a week later, Yu won her first World Cup victory in the 500 m at Nagano, and a second-place in the 1000 m. During the 2009 World Sprint Championships in Moscow, she managed to secure a bronze medal. The rest of the season, she raced consistently and acquired multiple podium places in the World Cup, but there were no more victories. In the World Cup total, Yu placed 5th in the 500 m and 9th in the 1000 m.  At the 2009 World Single Distance Championships in Richmond, Yu missed the podium in both the 500 m and 1000 m events, finishing 4th and 12th, respectively.

Her next season at the top level was a lot less fruitful than the first. In the World Cup, she was struggling to copy the results of her first year, and at the end of the season, she was never anywhere near reaching the podium. At the 2010 World Sprint Championships in Obihiro, Yu finished 6th. Yu also represented China at the 2010 Winter Olympics in Vancouver, but finished a disappointing 32nd in the 1000 m.

In the 2010–11 season, Yu returned as a force to be reckoned with and was on the podium three times in the 500 m World Cup stops in Changchun and Obihiro in December 2010. She chose not to compete anymore in the World Cup in order to concentrate on the 2011 Asian Winter Games in Astana, starting in the end of January 2011. The gamble turned out to be successful, and on 1 February, she managed to take the gold medal in the 500 m event, beating Wang Beixing and Lee Sang-hwa.

When the World Cup circuit started again in the fall of 2011, Yu began to dominate in the 500 m. At the first meeting in Chelyabinsk, she won both of the races over that distance, each time with a winning margin over 0.4 seconds. After skipping the second meeting in Astana, she likewise went on to triumph in both 500 m races in Heerenveen and also gained a second place in the 1000 m. Obviously, she could be a major contender for the 2012 World Sprint Championships in Calgary, and perhaps the only one capable of challenging the reigning champion, Christine Nesbitt.

On the first day of the championships, Yu had technical trouble in the 500 m and finished a disappointing 7th there, as well as gaining a respectable 4th spot in the 1000 m. After the first day of racing, she was in the fifth position, 0.665 points behind Nesbitt, who had set a world record in the 1000 m and looked like the clear favorite. On the second 500 m, Yu was paired with the then-current world record holder Jenny Wolf, but raced phenomenally, and passed the finishing line setting the time 36.94, thereby snatching the world record and becoming the first woman ever to skate a 500 m in under 37 seconds. She also overtook Nesbitt as the leader of the championships, though having a slim lead of 0.57 seconds before the final 1000 m, where the two would face each other in the final pair. There, Yu started aggressively and had the lead over Nesbitt after 200 m and 600 m. As expected, Nesbitt had the better last round and went on to win this distance, but she only managed beat Yu with 0.54 seconds. Yu finished with the time 1.13.47, and cut her personal best with over a second. In the end, Yu became the world champion by only 0.02 point margin, and also set the world record in the sprint combined.

Records

Personal records

World records

References

External links
 
 Yu Jing at SpeedSkatingNews.info
 
 
 

1985 births
Chinese female speed skaters
Speed skaters at the 2010 Winter Olympics
Speed skaters at the 2018 Winter Olympics
Olympic speed skaters of China
Living people
Asian Games medalists in speed skating
Speed skaters at the 2011 Asian Winter Games
Speed skaters at the 2017 Asian Winter Games
Medalists at the 2011 Asian Winter Games
Asian Games gold medalists for China
World Single Distances Speed Skating Championships medalists
World Sprint Speed Skating Championships medalists
Universiade medalists in speed skating
Universiade gold medalists for China
Universiade silver medalists for China
Universiade bronze medalists for China
Speed skaters at the 2007 Winter Universiade
Competitors at the 2009 Winter Universiade
Medalists at the 2007 Winter Universiade